Meurthe may refer to:
 Meurthe (department), a former subdivision of France
 Meurthe (river), a river in eastern France

See also
 Meurthe-et-Moselle, a current department of France